Sagamore is a census-designated place (CDP) in the town of Bourne in Barnstable County, Massachusetts, United States. The population was 3,623 at the 2010 census.  
"Sagamore" was one of the words used by northeastern Native Americans to designate an elected chief or leader.

Geography
Sagamore is located in the northeastern corner of the town of Bourne. It is bordered to the northeast by Cape Cod Bay, to the northwest by the town of Plymouth, to the west by the Massachusetts Route 3 expressway, to the southwest and south by U.S. Route 6 (the Mid-Cape Highway), and to the east by the town of Sandwich. The northern half of Sagamore is along the shore of Cape Cod Bay, known as Sagamore Beach. The Cape Cod Canal passes east to west through the southern part of the village. The Sagamore Bridge carrys Route 6 across the canal and into Sagamore.

According to the United States Census Bureau, Sagamore has a total area of :  of land and  (5.10%) of water.

Demographics

As of the census of 2000, there were 3,544 people, 1,307 households, and 968 families residing in Sagamore. The population density was 407.2/km (1,056.0/mi). There were 1,532 housing units at an average density of 176.0/km (456.5/mi). The racial makeup of the village was 98.93% White, 0.61% African American, 0.45% American Indian, 0.76% Asian, 0.03% Pacific Islander, 0.10% from other races, and 0.12% from two or more races. Hispanic or Latino of any race were 0.66% of the population.

The median income for a household in Sagamore was $103,385, and the median income for a family was $158,611. The per capita income for the village was $22,650.

See also
Sagamore Beach, Massachusetts

References

External links

Bourne, Massachusetts
Census-designated places in Barnstable County, Massachusetts
Census-designated places in Massachusetts
Populated coastal places in Massachusetts